George Wesley Miller (July 12, 1941 – June 27, 2016) was a judge of the United States Court of Federal Claims, appointed to that court in 2004 by President George W. Bush.

Early life, education, and career
Born in Schenectady, New York, Miller received a Bachelor of Arts, magna cum laude, from Princeton University in 1963, a Juris Doctor from Harvard Law School in 1966, and a Master of Laws in taxation from the George Washington University Law School in 1968. He was a law clerk to Judge Bruce M. Forrester of the United States Tax Court from 1966 to 1967, and was then an officer in the U.S. Navy Judge Advocate General Corps until 1970.

Miller was a trial attorney at Hogan & Hartson (now Hogan Lovells) for 33 years, from 1970 to 2004, including 26 years as a partner. He handled a broad range of civil litigation and commercial arbitration matters, developing an active practice representing both property owners and governmental entities in "takings" cases. His clients included Whitney Benefits, Inc. and Peter Kiewit Sons' Co., for whom he secured a $200 million settlement in 1995. In 1985, he was appointed by the District of Columbia Court of Appeals to the court's Board of Professional Responsibility, a nine-member panel that administers the lawyer disciplinary system in the District of Columbia. He served as Vice Chairman from 1988 to 1989, and then as Chairman until 1991). He was on the D.C. Court of Appeals Task Force on Racial and Ethnic Bias in the D.C. Courts from 1990 to 1992, and on the United States Court of Appeals for the District of Columbia Advisory Committee on Admissions and Grievances from 2002 to 2004.

In 1994, then Chief Loren A. Smith appointed Miller to the Court of Federal Claims Advisory Council, which consists of Court of Federal Claims bar members whose practices are representative of the court's docket. The Council advises the court on matters pertaining to court administration and the court's relationship with the bar and the public. Miller was re-appointed to the Advisory Council in 1999 by then Chief Lawrence M. Baskir and was a member of the Advisory Council at the time of his appointment to the court. Miller assisted in planning, and was one of several moderators at, an April 1999 symposium sponsored by the U. S. Court of Federal Claims entitled, "When Does Retroactivity Cross the Line? Winstar, Eastern Enterprises and Beyond," held in Washington, D. C. The proceedings were published in 51 ALA. L. REV. 933-1379 (2000). He also served on a court-appointed Litigation Practice Task Force, which was established following the 1995 Judicial Conference of the Court of Federal Claims to consider ways to expedite proceedings and improve the litigation process in the court. Miller was also a member of the U.S. Court of Federal Claims Bar Association's Board of Governors and served on the Board at the time of his appointment to the United States Court of Federal Claims.

Federal judicial service
Miller was appointed to the United States Court of Federal Claims by President George W. Bush. He received his commission as a judge on December 13, 2003. He retired in 2014 and Jeri Kaylene Somers was nominated as his replacement.

Memberships
Miller was admitted to the Bars of Virginia, the District of Columbia, and New York.

Personal life
He was married to Mary Katherine "Kay" Miller, with whom he had three children. Miller died on June 27, 2016 in Falls Church, Virginia.

References

External links 
United States Court of Federal Claims page on George W. Miller

1941 births
2016 deaths
Harvard Law School alumni
Judges of the United States Court of Federal Claims
United States Article I federal judges appointed by George W. Bush
21st-century American judges
Princeton University alumni
George Washington University Law School alumni
People associated with Hogan Lovells
People from Schenectady, New York